The Centre hospitalier Sud Seine et Marne is a teaching hospital in Fontainebleau, Montereau-Fault-Yonne and Nemours. It is a teaching hospital of Paris-Est Créteil University.

It is a result of the merger of three hospitals in each of the above cities.

It was established in January 2017.

References

Centre hospitalier Sud Seine et Marne

Hospitals in Île-de-France
Hospital buildings completed in 2017
Teaching hospitals in France
Buildings and structures in Île-de-France
Hospitals established in 2017
2017 establishments in France
21st-century architecture in France